Circobotys elongata is a moth in the family Crambidae. It was described by Eugene G. Munroe and Akira Mutuura in 1969. It is found in Taiwan.

References

Moths described in 1969
Pyraustinae